Beverly "Bev" Jean Plocki (born Beverly Jean Fry; September 6, 1964) is an American gymnastics coach, and the current coach of the Michigan Wolverines women's gymnastics team. In 32 years as the head coach at Michigan, her teams have a record of 830–263–4 and have won 25 Big Ten Conference championships, and advanced to 25 NCAA Women's Gymnastics Championships, including 16 straight NCAA championship tournaments from 1993 to 2008. Plocki led her team to the  NCAA Championship in 2021, the first championship won by a  Big Ten Conference team.

Biography
Plocki was an All-American gymnast on the balance beam at the University of Alabama.  She began her coaching career as a graduate assistant at West Virginia University while studying for a master's degree.  Plocki applied for an open coaching spot at the University of Michigan at age 23 and got the job.   When she took over at the University of Michigan, the women's gymnastics team was at a low point, having gone 0-13 and finished in last place in the conference in 1989 and having compiled a 1-10 record in 1988.  The Michigan gymnasts improved to 7-15 in Plocki's first season.  Plocki's conversion of the Michigan gymnastics program received a major boost when she succeeded in recruiting Toledo, Ohio, native Beth Wymer to Michigan.  In recruiting Wymer, Plocki told her: "You can go to one of the three dominant schools (Utah, Georgia or Alabama) and be another All-America on their list of All-Americas. Or, you can come to Michigan and be the first All-America."  Since then, Plocki has had All-Americans every year. Plocki gives Wymer credit for helping to build the Michigan gymnastics program: "I don't know where we would be today if she hadn't made the decision to come to Michigan.  Her being here allowed us to recruit a completely different level of athlete. It is monumental what she did for this program." In 2001, Plocki landed another blue-chip recruit when Elise Ray, captain of the 2000 U.S. Olympic gymnastics team committed to Michigan.

In 1992, Plocki led the Wolverines to a Big Ten championship.  Michigan went on to win six straight Big Ten championships starting in 1992 and also became one of the top teams in the NCAA championships.  In 1993, Plocki's squad made its first appearance in the NCAA championships and finished ninth.  In 1994, Michigan finished fourth in the NCAA championship and improved to No. 2 in 1995.  In 1997, Michigan's gymnasts won a sixth straight Big Ten championship, won all five events, and finished 1-2-3 in the all-around.  After missing the Big Ten championship in 1998, Plocki's teams started a new streak of seven straight conference titles from 1999 to 2005, a Big Ten record for most consecutive titles. The 1999 team also finished No. 2 at the NCAA championship.

In all, Michigan has won 23 Big Ten Championships under Plocki, including 15 of 17 Big Ten championships between 1992 and 2008. Plocki's teams also advanced to the NCAA championships 16 straight seasons between 1993 and 2008. Plocki is an 11-time Big Ten Coach of the Year, eight-time NCAA Regional Coach of the Year and was the 1994 NCAA National Coach of the Year.

In 2018, Plocki won her 23rd Big Ten championship. With the win, she tied former Indiana men's swimming head coach James Counsilman for the most championships by any head coach in any sport in Big Ten history.

In 2021, Plocki led Michigan to their first NCAA Women's Gymnastics Championships in program history.

Coaching record

References

External links
 U of M Women's Gymnastics
 UM Biography

1964 births
Living people
American gymnastics coaches
Michigan Wolverines women's gymnastics coaches
People from Butler, Pennsylvania
Alabama Crimson Tide women's gymnasts
West Virginia Mountaineers women's gymnasts
West Virginia Mountaineers women's gymnastics coaches